 

 
Jonathan Club is a social club with two California locations—one in Downtown Los Angeles and the other abutting the beach in Santa Monica. The club is routinely ranked as one of the top clubs in the world by Platinum Clubs of America.

History

The club has two founding dates set in stone at the entrance to its Downtown Los Angeles building — 1894 (when it was a political club) and 1895 (when it segued into a non-political social club and was chartered by State of California). The club bases its anniversaries on the June 8, 1895 date.

Membership in the club is by invitation only. For much of its history, the club was accused of discrimination. In 1965, the club was charged with "anti-Negro" and "anti-Jew" bias and a complaint was raised that the membership dues of Mayor Sam Yorty were being paid by city taxpayers to support such discrimination. Yorty told a news conference he knew nothing about such a circumstance. In 1975, the club did not admit women as members. Women guests were "limited to certain floors, dining rooms and entrances", though later policy changes allowed women to "use the main elevator and lobby" at the club.<ref name=PressuresMount1976>[https://search.proquest.com/docview/158155360 Barry Siegel, "Pressures Mount Against Discrimination," Los Angeles Times, December 6, 1976, page F-1]  Library card required</ref> It voted to admit women in 1987, and today has more than 650 female members.Tiffany Hsu, Dressing Up Downtown, Los Angeles Times Business section, April 19, 2013

The club today
The club provides dining, events, and athletic and wellness programs for members. Jonathan Club partners with the Congressional Medal of Honor Foundation and provides volunteers and funding to civic organization L.A. Works to combat homelessness.LA Works

Past and present members
Prominent members include:

 John D. Bicknell, founder of law firm that became Gibson, Dunn & Crutcher
 Herman Wolf Hellman, founder of Farmers & Merchants Bank; real estate investor
 Henry Huntington, railroad builder; land developer; rare art and book collector
 James Boon Lankershim, land developer
 John D. Spreckels, sugar and steamship entrepreneur
 Meredith Pinxton Snyder, banker; Los Angeles police chief, city councilman and mayor (three times)
 Peter Janss, developed East Los Angeles communities; philanthropist
 Edward Laurence Doheny, oilman
 Maurice Newmark, family built merchandise and grocery business into largest firm in Los Angeles
 Harry Chandler, publisher of the Los Angeles Times''
 Mericos Hector Whittier, oil industry pioneer; land developer
 William Wrigley Jr., chewing gum magnate
 A.P. Giannini, founder of Bank of Italy (later Bank of America)
 Edgar Rice Burroughs, adventure and science fiction author
 Robert A. Millikan, experimental physicist; recipient of the Nobel Prize; longtime president of California Institute of Technology
 Admiral C.C. Bloch, commander of 14th Naval District during Dec. 7, 1941 attack on Pearl Harbor
 George Pepperdine, founded Western Auto Supply; philanthropist; endowed George Pepperdine College (later Pepperdine University)
 Jesse Louis Lasky, created first permanent feature film company in what would become Hollywood; a founder of Paramount Pictures
 Tom Mix, early Western movie star
 Gordon Bernie Kaufman, prominent architect
 Rear Admiral Isaac Campbell Kidd, career U.S. Naval officer who perished aboard USS Arizona in 1941 attack on Pearl Harbor; posthumously received Medal of Honor
 Earl Warren, governor of California; chief justice of U.S. Supreme Court
 Buster Keaton, silent screen star
 Hal Roach, comedy writer, director and producer; created Hal Roach Studios
 Harold Lloyd, comedy movie star in silents and talkies; founded own studio
 Edmund G. Brown, lawyer and politician; governor of California
 Paul Gray Hoffman, automobile executive; president of Ford Foundation; received Medal of Freedom for work as first administrator of Marshall Plan after WWII
 John A. McCone, industrialist; head of Atomic Energy Commission; director of CIA; headed  McCone Commission to investigate causes of 1965 Watts riots and propose cures to avoid future outbreaks
 Ronald Reagan, movie actor; governor of California; president of the United States
 Arnold O. Beckman, prolific chemist and inventor; industrialist; funded first transistor company and fueled creation of Silicon Valley; philanthropist, including to Caltech where he studied and taught
 Peter O’Malley, owner and president of Los Angeles Dodgers

Locations
In 1924, the Club opened its present location at 545 S. Figueroa Street, one block west of the Los Angeles Public Library.

Since 1927, the club has had a beach location in Santa Monica, in a building designed by architect Gene Verge, Sr.

References

External links
 

Clubs and societies in California
Buildings and structures in Downtown Los Angeles
Culture of Los Angeles
Organizations based in Los Angeles
Gentlemen's clubs in California
Organizations established in 1895
1895 establishments in California
19th century in Los Angeles